The Changwon Stadium is a group of sports facilities in Changwon, South Korea. The complex consists of the Changwon Stadium, Changwon Gymnasium and a swimming pool.

Facilities

Changwon Stadium 
Changwon Stadium is a multi-use stadium in Changwon, South Korea. It is currently used mostly for football matches. The stadium holds 27,085 people and was built in 1993.

It served as the home ground of K League side Gyeongnam FC and the Korea National League side Changwon City FC prior to the construction of the Changwon Football Center in 2009.

2007 U-17 World Cup
The stadium was one of the venues of the 2007 U-17 World Cup, and held the following matches:

Changwon Gymnasium
Changwon Gymnasium is home of Changwon LG Sakers in the Korean Basketball League.

See also 
 Changwon Football Center

References

External links 
 Changwon Sports Facilities Management Center 
 World Stadiums

Athletics (track and field) venues in South Korea
Football venues in South Korea
Changwon City FC
Sports venues in Changwon
Sports venues completed in 1993
K League 1 stadiums